Journey's End is an album by Czech bassist Miroslav Vitouš recorded in 1982 and released on the ECM label.

Reception 
The Allmusic review by David R. Adler awarded the album 4 stars stating "Journey's End is highly recommended to those willing to search for it".

Track listing
All compositions by Miroslav Vitouš except as indicated
 "U Dunaje U Prešpurka" - 9:18 
 "Tess" (John Surman) - 5:56 
 "Carry On, No. 1" (Surman) - 5:08 
 "Paragraph Jay" (Surman) - 6:16 
 "Only One" - 7:14 
 "Windfall" (John Taylor) - 6:17 
Recorded at Talent Studio in Oslo, Norway in July 1982

Personnel 
 Miroslav Vitouš — double bass
 John Surman — soprano saxophone, baritone saxophone, bass clarinet 
 John Taylor — piano 
 Jon Christensen — drums

References 

ECM Records albums
Miroslav Vitouš albums
1983 albums
Albums produced by Manfred Eicher